Richard Bernard Strahs (December 4, 1923 – May 26, 1988) was an American professional baseball player, a right-handed pitcher who appeared in nine games for the  Chicago White Sox.

Strah was 30 years old and in his ninth season in the White Sox farm system when he was recalled from the Triple-A Charleston Senators in mid-1954. All of Strah's Major League appearances came as a relief pitcher. In his MLB debut, he retired the Boston Red Sox' Billy Consolo, Jimmy Piersall and Ted Williams in order in the eighth inning of a 5–2 loss at Fenway Park.  On August 26, he was credited with his only save in the Majors when he retired the Philadelphia Athletics in order in the final inning of an 8–1 win at Connie Mack Stadium.  Overall, Strahs appeared in  innings, surrendering 16 hits, nine earned runs and eight bases on balls. He also had eight strikeouts.

Strah's 11-season professional career lasted into the 1956 season. He posted a 107–88 record in 311 minor league games, all but 19 of them played in the White Sox system.

References

External links

1923 births
1988 deaths
Baseball players from Illinois
Charleston Senators players
Chicago White Sox players
Colorado Springs Sky Sox (WL) players
Hot Springs Bathers players
Lima Terriers players
Major League Baseball pitchers
Memphis Chickasaws players
Minneapolis Millers (baseball) players
Oakland Oaks (baseball) players
Superior Blues players
Waterloo White Hawks players